The Happy Time is a musical with music by John Kander, lyrics by Fred Ebb, and a book by N. Richard Nash loosely based on a 1950 hit Broadway play, The Happy Time by Samuel A. Taylor, which was in turn based on stories by Robert Fontaine.  The story had also been made into a 1952 film version.

The original 1967 Los Angeles and 1968 Broadway productions were directed and choreographed by Gower Champion, who won Tony Awards in each category.

Background and productions
Producer David Merrick had initially asked Cy Coleman and Dorothy Fields to write the songs and Yves Montand to play the lead, but they were all busy with other projects and declined to participate. Merrick then asked N. Richard Nash to write the script, but Nash suggested an original story of his own. Merrick, holding the rights to The Happy Time, asked that the setting be changed to Canada, and the deal was set. The final script had little of the Taylor play but did use the characters and some minor details from Fontaine's stories. Nash showed the outline of the story to Kander and Ebb, who agreed to write the music.

Merrick had approached Gower Champion to direct the new musical. Champion agreed, with the provision that it open in Los Angeles at the Ahmanson Theatre. Rehearsals began in September 1967 in Los Angeles, and the show opened on November 19 at the Ahmanson. Although the reviews were poor, the show was sold out. The show ran to December 23, 1967.

The Happy Time opened on Broadway at The Broadway Theatre on January 18, 1968.  It received mixed reviews from the critics, who generally admired the performances but noted large deficiencies in the script.  It closed on September 28, 1968, after a run of 286 sparsely attended performances and 23 previews.  It was the first Broadway musical to lose a million dollars. The production was directed, filmed, and choreographed by Gower Champion, set design by Peter Wexler, costume design by Freddy Wittop, lighting design by Jean Rosenthal, film sequences created by Christopher Chapman, film technical direction by Barry O. Gordon, orchestrations by Don Walker, musical direction and vocal arrangements by Oscar Kosarin, associate choreography by Kevin Carlisle, and dance and incidental music arrangements by Marvin Laird. John Serry Sr. collaborated as the orchestral accordionist in the Broadway production.

The production starred Robert Goulet (Jacques Bonnard), David Wayne (Grandpere Bonnard), Michael Rupert (Bibi Bonnard), George S. Irving (Philippe Bonnard), Charles Durning (Louis Bonnard), Julie Gregg (Laurie Mannon), Gena Page (Annabelle Bonnard), Julane Stites (Gillie Bonnard), Connie Simmons (Nanette Bonnard), June Squibb (Felice Bonnard), Jacki Garland (Lizette), Mary Gale Laverenz (Dorine), Tammie Fillhart (Sylvie), Gil Gimbel (Henri), Mary Ann O'Reilly (Monique), Vicki Powers (Bella), Susan Sigrist (Grace), Jeffrey Golkin (Foufie), and Dallas Johann (Ganache).

The play was profiled in the William Goldman book The Season: A Candid Look at Broadway (Hal Leonard Corporation, 1984). Goldman noted that "the projections simply overpowered the small size and feel of the show." (pg. 295).

The Goodspeed Opera House, East Haddam, Connecticut, presented the show in April 1980-May 1980. The production was revised, by rewriting the book "so that it no longer changes its tune in the second act", eliminating photographic projections and adding four songs that had been dropped.

In May 2002, the Niagara University Theatre in Niagara Falls, New York staged a revival of The Happy Time. John Kander and Fred Ebb went to Niagara University to work with the cast, helping recreate the work. "They were here a few weeks ago for rehearsals and thought the show was just beautiful..." Most notably, they incorporated five songs, originally cut from the musical, into the production, as well as making a few other minor changes. "This NU Theatre production, with Kander and Ebb's blessing, has reinstated several songs and restored text, prompting them to label this version 'definitive.'"

The revised version was performed in New York City for the first time in 2007 in a staged reading by "Musicals Tonight!", as part of their season long tribute to George S. Irving, who returned to the show, this time playing Jacques' father, Grandpere.

The Signature Theatre in Arlington, VA staged a revised production of The Happy Time from April 1, 2008 through June 1, 2008. The production was directed by Michael Unger and choreographed by Karma Camp.  It received favorable reviews.  For example, the Washington Post reviewer wrote: "A little charmer... Effervescent. The cast is strong... which is part of why it generally feels like a luxury to be able to see the show in this space."  Variety agreed: "Fresh and earnest... staged with ultimate intimacy in Signature's tiny ARK Theater."

Plot
Jacques Bonnard is a prize-winning photographer who travels the world. He returns to his 1920s French-Canadian village, after five years away, seeking the happy time of his childhood. His cantankerous but lovable father (Grandpere), two brothers and their wives, and their children all welcome him ("He's Back"). His stories of his travels have a profound effect on his nephew Bibi, who is having trouble at school and going through an especially rough puberty, inspiring the boy to want to live life to the fullest. Jacques goes to a nightclub and takes Grandpere and Bibi, where they are entertained by the dancers (Six Angels) ("Catch My Garter"). After their night on the town, Bibi begs Jacques to "Please Stay".

When Bibi takes Grandpere's "naughty" pictures to school and is discovered, his stern father Philippe forces him to apologize to his school-mates. Bibi is embarrassed and upset and tries to cajole Jacques into taking him away when he leaves. Although Jacques at first agrees, thinking that Bibi will be a companion, he quickly realizes that this would not be good for Bibi.

Meanwhile, Jacques finds it difficult to commit to his former sweetheart Laurie ("I Don't Remember You").  The couple finally realize that they have opposite ideas about life and the future ("Seeing Things"), with Laurie understanding that Jacques is emotionally a boy, like her students. Grandpere, Jacques and Bibi playfully sing an ode to "A Certain Girl". Jacques finally realizes that he returned home searching for family and love ("Running"), and understands that he must set out alone again.

Songs

Act I
"The Happy Time" – Jacques Bonnard and Family 
"Jeanne-Marie" - Jacques and Family +
"He's Back" – Family 
"Catch My Garter" – Six Angels 
"Tomorrow Morning" – Jacques, Grandpere, Bibi, and Six Angels
"Please Stay" – Bibi and Jacques 
"I Don't Remember You" – Jacques 
"St. Pierre" – Glee Club, Laurie Mannon, and Jacques
"I Don't Remember You (Reprise)" – Laurie and Jacques 
"Without Me" – Bibi and Schoolmates 
"In His Own Good Time" - Suzanne and Phillipe +
"The Happy Time (Reprise)" – Jacques 

Act II
"Among My Yesterdays" – Jacques 
"Please Stay (Reprise)" - Laurie +
"The Life of the Party" – Grandpere, Six Angels, and Schoolboys 
"I'm Sorry" - Bibi +
"Seeing Things" – Jacques and Laurie 
"A Certain Girl" – Grandpere, Jacques, and Bibi 
"Running" - Jacques +
"St. Pierre" - Bibi, Laurie, and Glee Club
"The Happy Time (Reprise)" – Jacques and Company

+Denotes songs added during the revised 2002 Niagara University production.

Awards and nominations

Original Broadway production

Recordings
The Original Broadway cast recording was released by RCA Victor Broadway in January 1968 and the CD was released on March 10, 1992.

Notes

References
Gilvey, J., "Before the Parade Passes by: Gower Champion and the Glorious American Musical" (2005), St. Martin's Press,

External links

 (archive)

1967 musicals
Broadway musicals
Musicals based on plays
Musicals by Kander and Ebb
Plays set in the 1920s
Works by N. Richard Nash
Plays set in Quebec
Tony Award-winning musicals